Rebecca Sarker (born 1975) is an English actress. After portraying the role of Nita Desai in the ITV soap opera Coronation Street from 1999 to 2000, she made various appearances in television series including Rosemary and Thyme , Doctors, Holby City, The Golden Hour and EastEnders. In 2018, she began appearing in the ITV soap opera Emmerdale as Manpreet Sharma.

Career
Sarker made her acting debut in the ITV soap opera Coronation Street as Nita Desai in 1999. Following her exit from the soap in 2000, she appeared in various television series, including two guest appearances on the BBC soap opera Doctors, appearances in the BBC medical dramas Holby City and Casualty and portraying Dr Newton in two episodes of the BBC soap opera EastEnders. She then starred in the ITV miniseries The Golden Hour as Nina Osbourne in 2005. In 2012, she made her film debut in the feature film John Carter. In 2018, it was announced that she had been cast as series regular Manpreet Jutla in the ITV soap opera Emmerdale. Then in 2022, she competed in the revival of the ITV series The Games.

Filmography

Awards and nominations

References

External links
 

1975 births
20th-century English actresses
21st-century English actresses
Actors from Halifax, West Yorkshire
English soap opera actresses
English television actresses
Living people
English people of Indian descent